is a Japanese former professional footballer who played as a forward. He made four appearances for the Japan national team scoring once.

Club career
Nagai played his youth football at Mitsubishi Yowa Club. After graduating from high school in 1997, he joined Urawa Reds. He made his professional debut on 12 April of that year in the opening league match against Yokohama Marinos at Urawa Komaba Stadium.

Nagai was loaned out to German 2. Bundesliga side Karlsruher SC from 1998 to 1999. He played 21 league games and scored 4 goals for reserve team.

In 2003, Nagai took over the number "9" jersey from iconic Masahiro Fukuda after the latter retired from the game. He scored a hat trick against Tokyo Verdy on 21 August 2004. In the same match, his teammate Koji Yamase also scored three goals. On 1 January 2007, he was instrumental in Urawa defending the Emperor's Cup by scoring a late winner assisted by Masayuki Okano. The club won the champions 2006 J1 League, 2003 J.League Cup, 2005 and 2006 Emperor's Cup until 2006.

In 2007, AFC Champions League, Nagai helped Urawa win the tournament scoring 3 goals. He was named the player of the tournament. Urawa also won the 3rd place at 2007 FIFA Club World Cup.

On 7 January 2009, Nagai transferred to Shimizu S-Pulse. He played until 2011. After that, he played for Yokohama FC (2012–13), Arterivo Wakayama (2014) and Thespakusatsu Gunma (2015–17).

International career
Nagai was a member of the Japan team for the 1997 World Youth Championship hosted by Malaysia. He played all 5 matches and scored a goal against Costa Rica at the group stage. The team was eliminated at the quarterfinal. He also represented Japan at the 1999 World Youth Championship hosted by Nigeria. He played all 7 matches and scored a goal in the semi-final against Uruguay and contributed to the team finishing runners-up in the competition.

He made his full international debut for Japan on 21 April 2003 in a friendly against South Korea at Seoul World Cup Stadium. His first international goal was the winner in the same match. He also played at 2003 Confederations Cup. He is so far capped 4 times and scored 1 goal.

Career statistics

Club
Source:

FIFA Club World Cup

International
Source:

International goals

Appearances in major competitions

Honors and awards

Individual
 AFC Champions League Player of the Tournament: 2007

Team
 AFC Champions League Winner: 2007
 J1 League Winner: 2006
 Emperor's Cup Winner: 2005, 2006
 J.League Cup Winner: 2004
 Japanese Super Cup Winner: 2006
 FIFA World Youth Championship Runner-up: 1999

References

External links
 
 
 Japan National Football Team Database
 
 Profile at Thespakusatsu Gunma 
 

1979 births
Living people
Association football people from Tokyo
Japanese footballers
Japan youth international footballers
Japan international footballers
J1 League players
J2 League players
Urawa Red Diamonds players
Karlsruher SC II players
Shimizu S-Pulse players
Yokohama FC players
Arterivo Wakayama players
Thespakusatsu Gunma players
2003 FIFA Confederations Cup players
Japanese expatriate footballers
Expatriate footballers in Germany
Japanese expatriate sportspeople in Germany
Association football forwards